Events in the year 1966 in Germany.

Incumbents
President – Heinrich Lübke 
Chancellor
Ludwig Erhard (until 30 November 1966)
Kurt Georg Kiesinger (from 30 November 1966)

Events 
 Germany in the Eurovision Song Contest 1966
 24 June–5 July – 16th Berlin International Film Festival
 1 December – The Kiesinger cabinet, led by Kurt Georg Kiesinger, is sworn in.
 Date unknown: German company Hannover Re was founded.

Births
30 January – Hans Tutschku, German composer
7 February – Claudia Nolte, German politician
7 February – Kristin Otto, German swimmer
8 February – Bruno Labbadia, German footballer and manager
9 February – Christoph Maria Herbst, German actor and comedian
16 February – Martin Perscheid, German cartoonist (d. 2021)
22 February – Thorsten Kaye, German-English actor
18 March – Anne Will, German journalist
3 April – Michael Mittermeier, German comedian
4 April – Stefan Mappus, German politician
19 April – Oliver Welke, German television presenter, actor, comedian and sports journalist
21 April – Francis Fulton-Smith, German-British actor
3 May – Katrin Göring-Eckardt, German politician
8 May – Rocko Schamoni, German entertainer, author and musician
9 May – Stefan Quandt, German engineer and industrialist
11 May – Christoph Schneider, German musician
25 May – Tatjana Patitz, German model and actress (died 2023)
28 May – Theo Bleckmann, German vocalist and composer
30 May – Thomas Häßler, German football player
31 May – Frank Goosen, German cabaret artist and novelist
1 June – Sven Rothenberger, German equestrian
5 June – Sebastian Krumbiegel, German singer
1 July – Zita-Eva Funkenhauser, German fencer
7 July – Gundula Krause, German-Irish violinist
8 July – Ralf Altmeyer, German virologist
14 July – Ralf Waldmann, German motorcycle race (died 2018)
18 July – Kathrin Neimke, German track and field athlete
23 July – Wolfgang Büchner, German journalist
1 August – Axel Oberwelland, German businessman
7 August – Stefan Heße, German bishop of Roman Catholic Church
25 August – Sandra Maischberger, German journalist
7 September – Gunda Niemann-Stirnemann, German speed skater
13 September – Maria Furtwängler, German actress
19 September – Heiko Maas, German politician
22 September – Erdoğan Atalay, German-Turkish actor
30 September – Leo Löwenstein, German racing driver (died 2010)
8 October – Tabea Zimmermann, German violinist
17 October – Donatus, Landgrave of Hesse, German nobleman
9 September – Georg Hackl, German luger
20 October – Stefan Raab, German television presenter
1 November – Barbara Becker, German model
16 November – Christian Lorenz, German musician
3 December – Bernd Althusmann, German politician

Deaths
 28 January — Ada Tschechowa, Russo-German actress (born 1916)
 23 March – August Bach, German politician (born 1897)	
 23 March – Hilde Schrader, German swimmer (born 1910)
 April 13 - Felix von Luckner, German nobleman, author and sailor (born 1881)
 May 8- Erich Pommer, German film producer and executive (born 1889)
 May 10 - Erich Engel, German film and theatre director (born 1891)
 May 24 - Emil Fahrenkamp, German architect (born 1885)
 June 12 - Hermann Scherchen, German conductor (born 1891)
 July 16 - Bernhard Schweitzer, German archaeologist (born 1892)
 July 31 - Alexander von Falkenhausen, German general (born 1878)	
 August 22 - Günther Birkenfeld, German (born 1901)
 September 12 - Heinrich Stuhlfauth, German football player and goal keeper (born 1896)
 September 17 — Fritz Wunderlich, singer (born 1930)
 September 19 - Hermann von Oppeln-Bronikowski, equestrian and general (born 1899)
 October 17 - Wieland Wagner, German opera director (born 1917) 
 November 19 - Margarete Haagen, German actress (born 1889)
 December 3 - Friedrich Marby, German rune occultist and Germanic revivalist (born 1882)
 December 4 - Renate Ewert, German actress (born 1933)

See also
 1966 in German television

References

 
Years of the 20th century in Germany
1960s in Germany
Germany
Germany